Alavus Airfield is an airfield in Alavus, Finland, about  southwest of Alavus town centre.

See also
List of airports in Finland

References

External links
 VFR Suomi/Finland – Alavus Airfield
 Lentopaikat.net – Alavus Airfield 

Airports in Finland
Airfield